
Gmina Czernice Borowe is a rural gmina (administrative district) in Przasnysz County, Masovian Voivodeship, in east-central Poland.

Villages
Gmina Czernice Borowe contains the villages and settlements of Borkowo-Boksy, Borkowo-Falenta, Chojnowo, Chrostowo Wielkie, Czernice Borowe, Dzielin, Górki, Grójec, Jastrzębiec, Kadzielnia, Kosmowo, Miłoszewiec, Nowe Czernice, Obrębiec, Olszewiec, Pawłówko, Pawłowo Kościelne, Pierzchały, Rostkowo, Szczepanki, Turowo, Węgra, Załogi, Zberoż, Żebry-Idźki, Żebry-Kordy and Zembrzus Wielki.

Neighbouring gminas
Gmina Czernice Borowe is bordered by the gminas of Dzierzgowo, Grudusk, Krasne, Krzynowłoga Mała, Opinogóra Górna, Przasnysz and Regimin.

References

Polish official population figures 2006

Czernice Borowe
Przasnysz County